Jean Paulo Fernandes Filho (born 26 October 1995), simply known as Jean, is a Brazilian professional footballer who plays as a goalkeeper for Cerro Porteño.

Club career

Bahia
Born in Salvador, Bahia, Jean graduated with Bahia's youth setup, being promoted to the main squad in 2015. In February 2015 he was elected as first-choice, profiting from an injury crisis in the squad, and signed a new three-year deal with the club late in the month.

Jean made his professional debut on 9 May 2015, starting in a 1–1 away draw against América Mineiro for the Série B championship. Mainly a backup during the club's promotion campaign, he only featured in three league matches during that year.

Jean became an undisputed starter during the 2017 season, and made his Série A debut on 14 May 2017 in a 6–2 home routing of Atlético Paranaense. He featured in all 38 league matches of the tournament, as his side finished in a mid-table position.

São Paulo
On 22 December 2017, Jean agreed to a five-year contract with fellow top tier club São Paulo. On 9 January 2020, the player had his contract suspended until the end of the year following an accusation of violence against his wife the previous month.

Atlético Goianiense (loan)
On 13 January 2020, Jean was loaned to fellow top tier club Atlético Goianiense. On 13 September, he scored the first goal of his career in a 1–0 Série A win at Bahia, volleying a rebound off the wall from a free kick he himself had taken. He scored a further five times during that season, all of which from penalty kicks. On 27 February 2021, he won the 2020 Campeonato Goiano title.

Cerro Porteño (loan)
On 27 March 2021, Jean joined Paraguayan Primera División club Cerro Porteño on loan until December. Fernandes joined the club in replacement of Cerro Porteno's first choice goalkeeper, the Uruguayan - Paraguayan Rodrigo Muñoz,
who was injured. Upon arrival, Fernandes was only able to play games in the 2021 Copa Libertadores.

International career
On 15 May 2015 Jean was included in Brazil under-20s' final list ahead of that year's FIFA U-20 World Cup.

Career statistics

List of goals scored

Following, is the list with the goals scored by Jean:

Personal life
Jean's father, also named Jean, was also a footballer and a goalkeeper. He too was groomed at Bahia.

Honours 
Bahia
Copa do Nordeste: 2017

 Atlético Goianiense
Campeonato Goiano: 2020

Cerro Porteño
Paraguayan Primera División: 2021 (clausura)

References

External links
 
 
 

1995 births
Living people
Sportspeople from Salvador, Bahia
Brazilian footballers
Association football goalkeepers
Campeonato Brasileiro Série A players
Campeonato Brasileiro Série B players
Esporte Clube Bahia players
São Paulo FC players
Atlético Clube Goianiense players
Cerro Porteño players
Brazil under-20 international footballers
Brazilian expatriate footballers
Brazilian expatriate sportspeople in Paraguay
Expatriate footballers in Paraguay